Emma Alekseevna Gamisonia is a politician from Abkhazia. She currently serves as Vice-Speaker of the People's Assembly of Abkhazia.

Gamisonia was first elected to the Assembly in the election of 2002. Her name was initially included among the members of the political party Republic at the time of its formation, although it later became clear that this had been done without her knowledge and against her will.  She was returned to the Assembly again in the elections of 2007 and 2012, in the latter becoming the only woman to win a seat in the body. She has served as Vice-Speaker since she was first elected to the position in 2012. In 2016 she remained the only woman serving in the Assembly; that year she was one of only two lawmakers to vote against a ban on abortion passed by the parliament. In 2017 she spoke against the gender law passed by the People's Assembly in 2008, admitting that while its goals were laudable it did not work; she has also been invited to participate in women's forums elsewhere. Gamisonia has expressed her support for the Republic of Artsakh, hitherto unrecognized by any member state of the United Nations.

References

Living people
Abkhazian women in politics
3rd convocation of the People's Assembly of Abkhazia
4th convocation of the People's Assembly of Abkhazia
5th convocation of the People's Assembly of Abkhazia
21st-century women politicians
Year of birth missing (living people)